Psy 6 (Six Rules), Part 1 is the first extended play by South Korean pop rapper Psy, though it is treated as his sixth major album release due to the cancellation of the release of his part 2. It was released on July 15, 2012, the same day "Gangnam Style" was released as the lead single. The EP has sold 106,594 copies in South Korea.

Psy 6 (Six Rules), Part 1 was released in a tin that had a fishbowl-like appearance. Inside the tin is a card that contains the album artwork, cards which contain artwork and lyrics for each of the songs (the artwork for "Gangnam Style" was different from the Germany-released single's art), a card for the credits, two cards of advertising from YG Entertainment and the CD. The whole ensemble is packaged in a white box printed with information.

Second part 
In 2015, Psy revealed in his press interview for his 7th full length album that Part 2 was skipped due to his wishes to vent from the popularity of "Gangnam Style" and start anew with the lucky number 7 and because he needed more studio albums rather than EPs considering his lower numbers of full length albums in his career and the long wait of three years and five months between part 1 and his next project.

Samples and covers
The track "Year of 77" samples Switch's "I Call Your Name" (featuring Bobby DeBarge) from their album Switch II (1979). This sample contains vocals from that song. He also translated a part of the lyrics from "La Di Da Di" by Slick Rick feat. Doug E. Fresh to use here. South Korean recording artist Roy Kim covered "Blue/Tree Frog" on the eleventh episode of Mnet's talent competition series Superstar K4, where he was crowned the final winner of the show.

Track listing

Notes
 Track 2 is a remake of the song under the same title, which was originally performed by South Korean one-man project band Toy, from their sixth studio album Thank You released in 2007.
 The title of track 4 literally means "Seventy-Seven 101".

Chart performance

Weekly charts

Monthly charts

Year-end charts

 Sales come from the South Korean imported version.

Sales

Other songs charted

References

Notes

External links

 Official website

Psy albums
2012 EPs
YG Entertainment EPs
KMP Holdings EPs